= Ranunculus altus =

Scientific classification
- Kingdom: Plantae
- Clade: Tracheophytes
- Clade: Angiosperms
- Clade: Eudicots
- Order: Ranunculales
- Family: Ranunculaceae
- Genus: Ranunculus
- Species: R. altus

Binomial name
- Ranunculus altus Garn.-Jones

Species of flowering plant

Ranunculus altus is a species of flowering plant in the buttercup family, Ranunculaceae, endemic to New Zealand. It was described in 1987 by New Zealand botanist Philip Garnock-Jones.
